James Dawson (13 August 1890 – 1933) was a Scottish professional footballer who played as a striker.

Career
He scored three goals in 13 league appearances for Liverpool in the 1913–14 season. He also played for Leith Athletic, Hearts, Dumbarton, Albion Rovers, Alloa Athletic, St Mirren and Bo'ness.

References

1890 births
1933 deaths
Scottish footballers
Leith Athletic F.C. players
Liverpool F.C. players
Dumbarton F.C. players
Scottish Football League players
English Football League players
Association football forwards
Footballers from Edinburgh
Heart of Midlothian F.C. players
Albion Rovers F.C. players
Alloa Athletic F.C. players
St Mirren F.C. players
Bo'ness F.C. players